Fan Shengzhi shu ("Fan Shengzhi's book" or "Fan Shengzhi's manual") was a Chinese agricultural text from the Han dynasty, written by Fan Shengzhi in the first century BC. The book was lost in the 11th- or 12th-century Song dynasty, possibly during the Jurchen invasion. Several fragments of the text have survived as quotations in other books including Qimin Yaoshu, Yiwen Leiju, and Taiping Yulan.

Author
Fan Shengzhi was a Han dynasty official, possibly from Shandong, who served in the Guanzhong region first as court gentleman for consultation (議郎), then as agricultural development commissioner (勸農使) and commissioner of charioteers (輕車使者). The highest office he attained was that of censor-in-chief (御史).

Table of contents
 "Ploughing" (耕田)
 "Harvesting" (收種)
 "Irrigation" (溲種法)
 "Field usage" (區田法)
 "Grain" (禾)
 "Millet" (黍)
 "Wheat" (麥)
 "Rice" (稻)
 "Barnyard grass" (稗)
 "Large beans" (大豆)
 "Small beans" (小豆)
 "Nettle-hemp" (枲)
 "Hemp" (麻)
 "Melons" (瓜)
 "Gourds" (瓠)
 "Taros" (芋)
 "Mulberries" (桑)
 "Miscellaneous" (雜項)

References

1st-century BC books